The 2004 TAC Cup season was the 13th season of the TAC Cup competition. Calder Cannons have won their third premiership title after defeating the Eastern Ranges in the grand final by 70 points.

Ladder

Grand Final

References 

NAB League
Nab League